Norokhadok Brikkho is a Bengali adventure thriller film directed by Debarun Pal, The film was released on 5 December 2013 and it was screened at Nandan, Kolkata at the Kolkata Short Film Festival 2013. It stars Plaban Chakraborty, Krishnasish Pal and Dipa Bose. The plot revolves around a deserted village that leads a Man-Eater Tree. The film gained positive response from both the audience and critics.

Plot
The film starts with Rana (Krishnasish Pal) and his childhood love Dipa (Dipa Bose) are walking around a deserted rural village of Diamond Harbour to collect exotic flora samples. Dipa ask rana to gift her a leaf from the top branch of a Tree, then she will pose for Rana. Rana encountered a villager, Poltu (Plabon Chakraborty), who collects the leaf for Rana. Poltu tries distract them from collecting any further samples. Dipa found dried blood all over a place, under a strange old Banyan Tree. Poltu anyhow convinces them to return to their lodge. Late at night Rana found Dipa missing and smelled Poltu's sweat in his room. He rushed towards the old banyan tree, and reveals the secret that Poltu owns the Man-Eater banyan Tree and he is trying to kill Dipa as she now knew the secret about Poltu and the Tree. Rana and Poltu have a severe fight. The Man-Eater tree finally sucks Poltu inside and threw his dried body in front of Rana and Dipa.

Cast
 Plaban Chakraborty as Poltu
 Krishnasish Pal as Rana
 Dipa Bose as Dipa

Development
Debarun Pal was highly inspired from The Mummy, he wanted to build a life size Mummy Model, he got the model done from the artists of Singapore. Later Plabon Chakraborty suggests that the Mummy should the shaped more to Plabon's body type.

Awards and nominations
Kolkata Short Film Festival::
 Outstanding Visual Effects – Bengali (Official Selection)
 Screened at Nandan, Kolkata.

References

External links
 

2013 films
Bengali-language Indian films
2010s Bengali-language films